Human Nature is the 14th studio album by American folk rock duo America, released in 1998 by Oxygen Records. It was their first new studio album since 1994's Hourglass.  

"From a Moving Train" was released as the first single from the album, becoming a minor hit in the US, reaching #25 on the Radio & Records Adult Contemporary chart and did better in Europe, reaching #1 in Spain. "Wednesday Morning" and "Moment to Moment" were released as follow-up singles in Europe. "Wheels Are Turning" also received some radio airplay in the US. 

Carl Wilson (of the Beach Boys) and Robert Lamm (of Chicago) appear on "Hidden Talent". Wilson succumbed to cancer in February 1998 before this album's release.

Track listing

Reception

Allmusic gave a positive review of the album, stating "... the songs are uniformly well-crafted and hook-laden, in particular the highly atmospheric "From a Moving Train," and the jangly "Wednesday Morning."  Nevertheless, the album was rated only two stars out of five.

References

America (band) albums
1998 albums